is a Japanese writer of mystery and thriller novels and one of Japan's bestselling authors. He is a member of the Mystery Writers of Japan and has won many prestigious awards. Several of his popular Reiko Himekawa crime novels have been translated into English, German, Polish, Chinese, Persian, Thai and Vietnamese. In Japan, several of Honda's works have been adapted into major theatrical motion pictures and TV dramas, including Strawberry Night and Strawberry Night Saga.

Works in translation
Lieutenant Himekawa series
The Silent Dead (original title: Strawberry Night), trans. Giles Murray (Minotaur Books, 2016; Titan Books, 2016)
Blutroter Tod, trans. Irmengard Gabler (FISCHER, 2016)
Przeczucie, (original title: Strawberry Night), trans. Rafał Śmietana (Społeczny Instytut Wydawniczy Znak, 2017)
Soul Cage (Minotaur Books, 2017)
Stahlblaue Nacht (original title: Soul Cage), trans. Irmengard Gabler (FISCHER, 2017)
Rouge est la nuit (original title: Strawberry Night), trans. Dominique Sylvain and Frank Sylvain (Atelier Akatombo, France, 2019)

Main works

Lieutenant Himekawa series
 Novels
 , 2006 (The Silent Dead, Minotaur, 2016), (Rouge est la nuit, Akatombo, 2019)
 , 2007 (Soul Cage, Minotaur, 2017)
 , 2009
 , 2012
 , 2016
 Short story collections
 , 2008
 , 2014
 Spin-off novel
 , 2011 (Infection Game)

Jiu trilogy
 Novels
 , 2005
 , 2006
 , 2006
 Spin-off novels
 , 2007
 , 2009
 , 2010
 , 2014
 , 2016

See also

Japanese detective fiction

References
 Profile at J'Lit Books from Japan  

1969 births
21st-century Japanese novelists
Japanese male short story writers
Japanese mystery writers
Japanese crime fiction writers
Living people
Writers from Tokyo
21st-century Japanese short story writers
21st-century male writers